Claresholm is a town located within southern Alberta, Canada.

One of the Famous Five involved in the Persons Case, Louise McKinney, lived in Claresholm and was elected as the Member of the Legislative Assembly of Alberta for the area in the 1917 provincial election.

History 
The location was originally a watering stop for steam engines on the Canadian Pacific Railway line along the Macleod Trail when the trains first arrived in the area in 1891. The first settlers arrived in 1902, and the village was established in 1903. Claresholm was incorporated as a town in 1905, the year Alberta became a province. The community was named after Clare Niblock, a pioneer citizen.

In 1913, Alberta established a demonstration farm and School of Agriculture at Claresholm. The first hospital in Claresholm opened in 1921 and was replaced by the current hospital in 1939.

Royal Canadian Air Force Station Claresholm was established near the town in 1941 to train pilots for service in World War II. It first opened June 9, 1941 as a British Commonwealth Air Training Plan base.  No. 15 Service Flying Training School operated at the base from its opening until March 1945. In 1951, the base was used to train pilots for the Korean War and operated as No. 3 Flying Training School. It also trained NATO pilots. The base closed in 1958 and the hangars were converted to industrial use. A portion of the former base operates as Claresholm Industrial Airport. Among the artifacts in the Claresholm Museum from the air base is a Link Trainer.

The Claresholm highway massacre took place just north of Claresholm on Alberta Highway 2 on December 15, 2011. The suspect killed three people then turned the gun on himself in a murder–suicide.

Geography

Climate 
Claresholm experiences a humid continental climate (Köppen climate classification Dfb).  During winter, Chinook winds have been known to move temperatures from well below freezing to well above in a matter of hours.

Demographics 

In the 2016 Census of Population conducted by Statistics Canada, the Town of Claresholm recorded a population of 3,780 living in 1,644 of its 1,742 total private dwellings, a  change from its 2011 population of 3,758.

See also 
List of communities in Alberta
List of towns in Alberta

References

External links 

1903 establishments in the Northwest Territories
Towns in Alberta
Populated places established in 1903